The 1994 ARFU Asian Rugby Championship was the 14th edition  of the tournament, and was played in Kuala Lumpur. It also doubled up as the Asian qualifying tournament for the 1995 Rugby World Cup. The eight teams were divided in two pools with a round robin played in each. The top teams in each pool then played off in the final to decide the tournament winner.  Japan won the competition, defeating South Korea  by 26–11 in the final, and subsequently represented Asia in the 1995 Rugby World Cup.

Tournament

Pool 1

Pool 2

Finals

Play-off for 3rd

Final

References

1994
1994 in Asian rugby union
1994 rugby union tournaments for national teams
1994
1995 Rugby World Cup qualification
International rugby union competitions hosted by Malaysia
rugby union